Ramesh Prasad Khatik also known as Ramesh Khatik is an Indian politician and a member of the Legislative Assembly of Madhya Pradesh representing the Karera constituency and is a member of the Bhartiya Janata Party.

Early life and education 
Ramesh completed 12th class Madhyamik Education, Bhopal, Madhya Pradesh in 1986.

Political career 
Ramesh Prasad Khatik is an Indian politician and a member of the Legislative Assembly of India representing the Karera constituency of Madhya Pradesh and is a member of the Bhartiya Janata Party.

References 

1969 births
Living people
Bharatiya Janata Party politicians from Madhya Pradesh